Liquor is an alcoholic drink produced by distillation of grains, fruit, or vegetables that have already gone through alcoholic fermentation; in North America, the term may also designate any alcoholic drink.

Liquor may also refer to:

 Liquor (novel series), a novel series by Poppy Z. Brite
 Liquor, a 2017 album by Lil Wyte
 Liquor (Lydia album), 2018
 "Liquor" (song), a 2015 song by Chris Brown
 A sauce served with Pie and mash
 The liquid produced from fermented tea leaves
 Liquor cerebrospinalis, cerebrospinal fluid

See also
 Liquor store
 Liquor license
 List of national liquors
 Flavored liquor
 Malt liquor
 Pot liquor
 Chocolate liquor
 Green liquor
 White liquor
 Black liquor
 Mother liquor
 Corn steep liquor